Shimeji (Japanese: ,  or ) is a group of edible mushrooms native to East Asia, but also found in northern Europe. Hon-shimeji (Lyophyllum shimeji) is a mycorrhizal fungus and difficult to cultivate. Other species are saprotrophs, and buna-shimeji (Hypsizygus tesselatus) is now widely cultivated. Shimeji is rich in umami-tasting compounds such as guanylic acid, glutamic acid, and aspartic acid.

Species
Several species are sold as shimeji mushrooms. All are saprotrophic except Lyophyllum shimeji.

Mycorrhizal
 Hon-shimeji, Lyophyllum shimeji
The cultivation methods have been patented by several groups, such as Takara Bio  and Yamasa, and the cultivated hon-shimeji is available from several manufacturers in Japan.

Saprotrophic
 Buna-shimeji (lit. beech shimeji), Hypsizygus tessellatus, also known in English as the brown beech or brown clamshell mushroom.
Hypsizygus marmoreus is a synonym of Hypsizygus tessellatus. Cultivation of Buna-shimeji was first patented by Takara Shuzo Co., Ltd. in 1972 as hon-shimeji and the production started in 1973 in Japan. Now, several breeds are widely cultivated and sold fresh in markets.
 Bunapi-shimeji, known in English as the white beech or white clamshell mushroom.
Bunapi was selected from UV-irradiated buna-shimeji ('hokuto #8' x 'hokuto #12') and the breed was registered as 'hokuto shiro #1' by Hokuto Corporation.
 Hatake-shimeji, Lyophyllum decastes.
 Shirotamogidake, Hypsizygus ulmarius.
 These two species had been also sold as hon-shimeji.
 Velvet pioppino (alias velvet pioppini, black poplar mushroom, Chinese: /), Agrocybe aegerita.

Shimeji health benefits
Shimeji mushrooms contain minerals like potassium and phosphorus, magnesium, zinc, and copper. Shimeji mushrooms lower the cholesterol level of the body. This mushroom is rich in glycoprotein (HM-3A), marmorin, beta-(1-3)-glucan, hypsiziprenol, and hypsin therefore is a potential natural anticancer agent. Shimeji mushrooms contain angiotensin I-converting enzyme (ACE) inhibitor which is an oligopeptide that may be helpful in lowering blood pressure and reducing the risk of stroke in persons having hypertension. Also rich in polysaccharides, phenolic compounds, and flavonoids. Therefore, inhibits inflammatory cytokines and oxidative stress and protects from lung failure. These compounds also help in reducing oxidative stress-mediated disease through radical scavenging activity hence these mushrooms are antioxidants also.

Cooking
Shimeji should always be cooked: it is not a good mushroom to serve raw due to a somewhat bitter taste, but the bitterness disappears completely upon cooking. The cooked mushroom has a pleasant, firm, slightly crunchy texture and a slightly nutty flavor.  Cooking also makes this mushroom easier to digest. It works well in stir-fried foods like stir-fried vegetables, as well as with wild game or seafood. Also, it can be used in soups, stews, and in sauces. When cooked alone, Shimeji mushrooms can be sautéed whole, including the stem or stalk (only the very end cut off), using a higher temperature or they can be slow roasted at a low temperature with a small amount of butter or cooking oil. Shimeji is used in soups, nabe and takikomi gohan.

See also

List of Japanese ingredients

References

External links
 Honshimeji Mushroom, RecipeTips.com. Brown Beech (Buna shimeji), White Beech (Bunapi shimeji), and the Pioppino (Agrocybe aegerita) mushrooms.

Edible fungi
Fungi in cultivation
Japanese cuisine terms
Fungi of Asia
Fungus common names